Elatochori is a village and a community of the Zagori municipality, northwestern Greece. Before the 2011 local government reform it was part of the municipality of East Zagori, of which it was a municipal district. The 2011 census recorded 71 inhabitants in the village and 90 in the community. The community of Elatochori covers an area of 34.802 km2.

Administrative division
The community of Elatochori consists of two separate settlements: 
Dilakko (population 19)
Elatochori (population 71)
The aforementioned population figures are as of 2011.

See also
List of settlements in the Ioannina regional unit

References
Εγκυκλοπαίδεια Νέα Δομή. Αθήνα: Τεγόπουλος - Μανιατέας. 1996. σελ. 104, τομ. 11

Populated places in Ioannina (regional unit)